Macedonian most often refers to someone or something from or related to Macedonia.

Macedonian(s) may specifically refer to:

People

Modern
 Macedonians (ethnic group), a nation and a South Slavic ethnic group primarily associated with North Macedonia
 Macedonians (Greeks), the Greek people inhabiting or originating from Macedonia, a geographic and administrative region of Greece
 Macedonian Bulgarians, the Bulgarian people from the region of Macedonia
 Macedo-Romanians (disambiguation), an outdated and rarely used anymore term for the Aromanians and Megleno-Romanians, both being small Eastern Romance ethno-linguistic groups present in the region of Macedonia
 Macedonians (obsolete terminology), an outdated and rarely used umbrella term to designate all the inhabitants of the region, regardless of their ethnic origin, as well as the local Slavs and Romance-speakers, as a regional and ethnographic communities and not as a separate ethnic groups

Ancient
 Ancient Macedonians, an ancient Greek tribe associated with the ancient region and kingdom of Macedonia

Languages
 Macedonian language, a modern South Slavic language spoken by ethnic Macedonians
 Ancient Macedonian language, an extinct language, probably related to the ancient Greek language
 Macedonian dialect, one of the varieties of Modern Greek, spoken in the region of Macedonia in Greece

Other uses
 Macedonian dynasty, a line of rulers of the Byzantine Empire (867–1056)
 Pneumatomachi, also known as Macedonians, a 4th-century Byzantine Christian sect
 HMS Macedonian, a British frigate (1808–1812)
 Makedonikos F.C., a Greek football club whose name means 'Macedonian'

See also
 Macedonia (terminology)
 Macedonia naming dispute
 Macedonian Greek (disambiguation)
 Macedonian Slavs (disambiguation)
 Macedonian art (disambiguation)
 Macedonian culture (disambiguation)
 Macedonian diaspora (disambiguation)
 Macedonian language (disambiguation)
 Macedonian Orthodox Church (disambiguation)
 Macedon (disambiguation)

Language and nationality disambiguation pages